Villa Cayumapu is a hamlet north of the city of Valdivia near Pichoy Airport and next to Cayumapu River. It had 291 inhabitants as of 2017.

References

Populated places in Valdivia Province